The Ministry of Religious Affairs is an Indonesian ministry that administers religious affairs. It is responsible to the president, and is led by a minister.

History
Plans for the creation of a Ministry of Religious Affairs was proposed for first time in the meeting of Committee for Preparatory Work for Indonesian Independence by Mohammad Yamin at 11 July 1945. He proposed to create special religion-related ministry, Ministry of Islamic Affairs, which ensures Indonesian Muslim affairs. However, this proposal didn't gather much reception.

For a second time, the creation of a Ministry of Religious Affairs was proposed in session of Preparatory Committee for Indonesian Independence at 19 August 1945. The proposal was accepted by six from 27 members. Johannes Latuharhary, who rejected the proposal, proposed to handle religion affairs in Ministry of Education. Abdul Abbas supported Johannes' proposal. Iwa Kusumasumatri agreed that religious affairs should be handled by the ministry, however rejected the creation of special-religion ministry because of national scope of government. Ki Hadjar Dewantara proposed that religious affairs should be handled by Ministry of Home Affairs. The session rejected the creation of Ministry of Religious Affairs. Thus, Ministry of Religious Affairs had not been created until First Sjahrir Cabinet.

The creation of Ministry of Religious Affairs was re-proposed, for a 3rd time to Badan Pekerja Komite Nasional Indonesia Pusat at 11 November 1946 by K.H. Abudardiri, K.H. Saleh Suaidy, and M. Sukoso Wirjosaputro. This proposal was also supported by Mohammad Natsir, Muwardi, Marzuki Mahdi, and Kartosudarmo. The proposal was accepted during the sessions of the Committee on 25–28 November 1945, thus the Ministry of Religious Affairs was created at 3 January 1946 with Haji Mohammad Rasjidi as Minister of Religious Affairs. Haji Mohammad Rasjidi was State Minister at the time that handled Islamic affairs. The Ministry of Religious Affairs took over marriage, religious court, mosque and hajj affairs from Ministry of Home Affairs, Islamic High Court from Ministry of Justice and religious education from Ministry of Education, Pedagogy and Culture.

Some people hold view that Ministry of Religious Affairs is not a new creation. Ministry of Religious Affairs can be traced back to Japanese Colonial Period (shūmubu, lit. Religious Affairs Office) or Dutch Colonial Period (lit. the Office for Indigenous Affairs). Sometime, people traced it back to Islamic kingdoms period.

Portfolio and function
In accordance with the Constitution and state legislation, in the performance of its mission the Ministry is entitled to:

 formulate, stipulate, and implement state policies for the religious communities of Indonesia.
 manage and administer state properties under the Ministry's ownership.
 supervise in the implementation of duties assigned to the Ministry.
 implement technical guidance and supervision of the implementation of affairs of Ministerial branch offices in the country's administrative divisions.
 implement any technical activities at all levels of society and within the administrative divisions of the nation or nationwide.

Organization
Ministry of Religious Affairs is organized into several units.
 Office of the Deputy Minister
 Secretariat General
 Inspectorate General
 Directorate Generals
 Directorate General of Islamic Education (Direktorat Jenderal Pendidikan Islam)
 Directorate General of Hajj and Umrah (Direktorat Jenderal Penyelenggaraan Haji dan Umrah)
 Directorate General of Islamic Community Guidance (Direktorat Jenderal Bimbingan Masyarakat Islam)
 Directorate General of Christian Community Guidance (Direktorat Jenderal Bimbingan Masyarakat Kristen)
 Directorate General of Catholic Community Guidance (Direktorat Jenderal Bimbingan Masyarakat Katolik)
 Directorate General of Hindu Community Guidance (Direktorat Jenderal Bimbingan Masyarakat Hindu)
 Directorate General of Buddhist Community Guidance(Direktorat Jenderal Bimbingan Masyarakat Buddha)
 Agencies
 Agency of Religious Moderation and Human Resource Development
 Agency of Halal Products Assurance (Badan Penyelanggara Jaminan Produk Halal)
 Centers
 Center of Confucianism Guidance and Education (Pusat Bimbingan dan Pendidikan Khonghucu)
 Expert Staffs
 Expert Staff of Religious Bodies Relation
 Expert Staff of Information and Communication Management
 Expert Staff of Law and Human Rights

References

See also

Religious Affairs
Indonesia